A disintegrin and metalloproteinase with thrombospondin motifs 7 (ADAMTS7) is an enzyme that in humans is encoded by the ADAMTS7 gene on chromosome 15. It is ubiquitously expressed in many tissues and cell types. This enzyme catalyzes the degradation of cartilage oligomeric matrix protein (COMP) degradation. ADAMTS7 has been associated with cancer and arthritis in multiple tissue types. The ADAMTS7 gene also contains one of 27 SNPs associated with increased risk of coronary artery disease.

Structure

Gene 
The ADAMTS7 gene resides on chromosome 15 at the band 15q24.2 and contains 25 exons.

Protein 
This 1686-amino acid protein belongs to the ADAMTS family and is one of 19 members known in humans. As an ADAMTS protein, ADAMTS7 contains a shared proteinase domain and an ancillary domain. The proteinase domain can be further divided into a signal peptide, a prodomain, a metalloproteinase domain, and a disintegrin-like domain.  In particular, the metalloproteinase domain contains a cysteine-switch motif in its binding site for binding the catalytic zinc ion (Zn2+). A pharmacophore model consisting of four hydrogen bond donor sites and three hydrogen bond acceptor sites was proposed for this domain. Unlike the proteinase domain, the ancillary domain varies by ADAMTS protein and includes any number of thrombospondin (TSP) type 1 motifs, one cysteine-rich and spacer domain, and other domains specific to certain ADAMTS proteins. ADAMTS7 in particular possesses 8 TSP type 1 motifs which, together with its spacer domain, participate in the protein’s tight interaction with the extracellular matrix.

Function 
ADAMTS7 was identified in a yeast two-hybrid screen using epidermal growth factor (EGF) domain of COMP as the bait. As a metalloproteinase, ADAMTS7 utilizes Zn2+ to catalyze its proteolytic function for COMP degradation.

In vascular smooth muscle cell (VSMC), ADAMTS7 mediates VSMC migration, which plays an essential role during the development of atherosclerosis and restenosis. Adamts7 deficiency in both the Ldlr−/− and Apoe−/− hyperlipidemic mouse models markedly attenuates formation of atherosclerotic lesions; furthermore, wire-injury experiments in the Adamts7−/− mouse show reduced neointima formation. The association of ADAMTS7 with atherosclerosis suggests that inhibition of ADAMTS7 should be atheroprotective in humans.

Clinical Significance 
A negative correlation between the expression levels of specific miRNAs and ADAMTS7 is observed in normal tissues but not in disease tissues, implying an altered miRNA-target interaction in the disease state. Accordingly, expression profiles of these miRNAs and ADAMTS7 may be useful diagnostic tools to differentiate cancer and lichen planus from normal tissues.  ADAMTS7 has also been identified as a putative oncogene and reported to be mutated exclusively in Asians, which may have implications for the prevention and treatment of hepatocellular carcinoma.  In addition, ADAMTS7 plays a crucial role in the pathogenesis of arthritis. For example, the FGF2/p65/miR-105/Runx2/ADAMTS axis is reportedly involved in osteoarthritis (OA) pathogenesis. Specifically, ADAMTS7 forms a positive feedback loop with tumour necrosis factor (TNF)-α in the pathogenesis of OA.

Clinical Marker 
Genome-wide association studies identified ADAMTS7 as a risk locus for coronary artery disease. Studies have been carried on classification of ADAMTS7 binding site, which may serve as the first step toward developing a new therapeutic target for coronary artery disease.  Significant associations for coronary artery calcification with SNPs in ADAMTS7 has also been found in Hispanics. Additionally, a multi-locus genetic risk score study based on a combination of 27 loci, including the ADAMTS7 gene, identified individuals at increased risk for both incident and recurrent coronary artery disease events, as well as an enhanced clinical benefit from statin therapy. The study was based on a community cohort study (the Malmo Diet and Cancer study) and four additional randomized controlled trials of primary prevention cohorts (JUPITER and ASCOT) and secondary prevention cohorts (CARE and PROVE IT-TIMI 22).

References

Genes on human chromosome 15
ADAMTS